RW Racing GP is a motorcycle racing team founded by businessman Roelof Waninge from The Netherlands. The team competes in the Moto2 World Championship.

History 

Roelof Waninge, was owner of a Dutch network of commercial vehicle dealerships and workshops headquartered in Assen, originally invested in motorcycle racing in 1993 as a personal sponsor of Dutch rider Jarno Janssen, who would go on to become RW's team principal after his riding career. In 2011, the long-standing Dutch 125 cc and 250 cc team owned by Arie Molenaar experienced financial trouble, prompting Waninge to purchase the remaining assets of the team and rename it RW Racing GP.

125 cc/Moto3 

The team began competing in 2011, taking over the existing 125 cc programme from Molenaar, using Aprilia machinery and retaining upcoming Spanish rider Luis Salom. In 2012 with the replacement of the 125 cc class by the new four-stroke Moto3 regulations, the team switched to Kalex-KTM machines, retaining Salom and adding South African rider Brad Binder. Salom finished the season in 2nd place with 2 wins and 8 podiums. In 2013, former Molenaar team rider Jarno Janssen, who had continued with the team and subsequently with RW in various technical roles after retirement as a racer, was named general team manager. 2014 would prove to be the team's worst season to date, with both riders Scott Deroue and Ana Carrasco failing to score a single point. 2015 saw a major change for the team, with a switch to Honda machinery and a reduction to a single rider, Livio Loi. Loi managed a win in 2015 at Indianapolis that season, but managed only one other top 10 finish with a 5th place at Silverstone Circuit. For the 2016 season, RW continued with Loi with similar overall results.

Moto2 

2017 saw another major step for the RW Racing GP team, as they moved up to Moto2 with Spanish rider Axel Pons on Kalex machinery.

For the 2018 season, RW joined forces with Japanese chassis manufacturer NTS to operate their factory programme as the sole users of the NTS chassis, expanding their programme to two riders. Despite NTS's relatively quick success in the previous two seasons of the CEV Moto2 European Championship, the challenge of the Moto2 World Championship proved difficult with RW finishing 16th and 15th from 18 teams in 2018 and 2019. Fortunes did not improve in 2020, finishing 14th of 15 teams on 22 points. For 2021, the team signed former Tech3 MotoGP rider Hafizh Syahrin and young Belgian rider Barry Baltus. The team scored just 11 points and finished last of all teams.

For 2022, the team ended their difficult partnership with NTS after four seasons, and returned to the series-dominant Kalex machines.They kept Barry Baltus onboard, with the Belgian now being paired up with the 16 year old Dutchman Zonta van den Goorbergh.

In 2023, Fieten Olie is the main sponsor of this team.

Results 

Notes
* Season still in progress.

References

External links 
 

Motorcycle racing teams
Motorcycle racing teams established in 2011
2011 establishments in the Netherlands